Ed Headrick, also known as "Steady" Ed Headrick, (June 28, 1924 – August 12, 2002) was an American toy inventor.  Headrick served in combat in the army in WWII and was a deep-sea welder. He is most well known as the father of both the modern-day Frisbee and of the sport and game of disc golf.

Toys 

Headrick's career began its tenure at Wham-O where he asked for a job making toys and was told they were not hiring. He asked to be hired without pay to prove his worth and was taken up on his offer. One of his early tasks was finding something to do with all the excess stock of Wham-O hula hoops left over after the Hula Hoop craze had run its course.

Frisbee 

Headrick eventually worked his way up to the head of research and development at Wham-O where he experimented with plastics and rubber and designed popular toys like the super ball. Headrick's role was to come up with new toy ideas and to come up with ways to improve toys that were not selling well. It was this job which led him to reevaluate Wham-O's flying saucer which had been created by the American Inventor Walter Frederick Morrison. 

With the flying saucer, Headrick envisioned not a better selling toy, but a redesign and invention of something bigger. Headrick's solution was the Frisbee design which was awarded U.S. Patent #3359678, and is the Frisbee disc design the world is familiar with today.
With his new Frisbee design patent, Ed saw the potential to create something more with the Frisbee. Headrick began a marketing and advertising blitz. With Ed's position at Wham-O, he began not only to heavily market the Frisbee by promoting the trick throws and games you could play, but he shifted the focus of the Frisbee to a sport.  Ed Headrick promoted the Frisbee, Frisbee games, and Frisbee sports events and rose to the ranks of Executive Vice President at Wham-O. During this time frame Headrick also founded the IFA, the International Frisbee Association that grew to over 85,000 members, to help in the promotion of Frisbee sports.

Ed competed in Frisbee Freestyle events and Frisbee sports like GUTS, but also practiced target shooting with Frisbees. Headrick, his son Ken and his friends created object courses through the city and parks. They would walk and challenge each other to hit things like trash cans, signs, trees, etc. with their Frisbees. Some nights Ed, his son Ken and his friends would sneak on to golf courses to play rounds of golf with discs. His skill with the Frisbee earned him the nickname "Steady".

Target shooting with Frisbees became Ed's new passion and he saw tremendous potential in Frisbee Golf as a legitimate game and sport with dedicated courses that regular people could play and even compete in tournaments. At Wham-O, Ed became increasingly focused on Frisbee Golf's potential and wanted to create and standardize a new game and sport called Frisbee Golf. Through Headrick's efforts, the Frisbee brand had become very important to Wham-O's bottom line. As the owners of the Frisbee Trademark, however, Wham-O did not share Ed's same vision for the viability of the standardized game of Frisbee Golf that Ed had. Wham-O would not allow license of the Frisbee trademark to be used for Frisbee Golf.

Disc golf

In 1975 Ed's tenure at Wham-O ended and ties between Headrick and Wham-O eventually split. Headrick left the company to start out on his own to focus all his efforts on his new interest, which he coined and trademarked "Disc Golf".

Disc Golf Association

In 1976 "Steady" Ed Headrick and his son Ken Headrick started the first disc golf company, the Disc Golf Association (DGA). The purpose of DGA was to manufacture discs and targets and to formalize the game for disc golf. The first disc golf target was Ed's pole hole design which basically consisted of a pole sticking out of the ground.

The First Disc Golf Basket 

In 1977, Headrick and his son Ken developed the modern basket catch for disc golf, US Patent 4,039,189, titled Flying Disc Entrapment Device, which they trademarked "Disc Pole Hole". The Disc Pole Hole created a standardized catching device that had a chain-hanger that held vertical hanging rows of chain out and away from a center pole. The vertical rows of chain came together forming a parabolic shape above and angling down towards a metal basket that attached to and surrounded the center pole, and could catch a disc from all directions.

Ed and his company DGA revised and obtained patents for basket designs until his death in 2002. Today there are over 14000 disc golf courses installed throughout the world, the majority of them using baskets modeled on the Disc Pole Hole DGA baskets Headrick designed.

PDGA 
In order to focus on creating the rules and standards for the sport and game as well as to create a self-sufficient dues-paying membership base, Headrick began the Professional Disc Golf Association (PDGA). Through the PDGA, Headrick and fellow disc golfers like Victor Malafronte worked to come up with the first rules and standards, which were printed out in small binders. Ed headed the PDGA until 1982 before turning the daily operation over to be run independently by an elected body of disc golf players. Headrick was PDGA member number 001 and today there are over 250,000 PDGA member numbers, with over 71,000 active paying dues members. PDGA continues to be the overseeing body for the sport of disc golf, with an elected Board of Directors.

In 2002, Headrick suffered two strokes while attending the Professional Disc Golf Association 2002 Amateur World Championships in Miami. He was able to get a medical flight back to his home in La Selva beach outside of Santa Cruz California, where he passed away soon afterward, on August 12, 2002, surrounded by his family and his friends. Ed's widow Farina Headrick took over running DGA when Headrick passed away.

“Steady” Ed Headrick: The Father of Disc Golf, The Modern Day Frisbee and Founder of DGA 

 Inventor of the sport of Disc Golf
 Inventor of the first disc golf basket, the Disc Pole Hole
 Designed and Installed the first Disc Golf course
 Inventor of the modern-day Frisbee
 Founded: The International Frisbee Association (IFA)
 Founded: Disc Golf Association (DGA)
 Founded: Professional Disc Golf Association (PDGA)
 Founded: Recreational Disc Golf Association (RDGA)
 Established and organized the first World Frisbee Championships and the Junior World Frisbee Championships.
 Established the first Disc Golf tournaments and a $50,000 landmark Frisbee Disc Golf Tournament in 1979.
 Donated his trademark “Disc Golf” to the public domain and his life to the sport he loved

Ash Discs 
As per Ed Headrick wishes, his ashes were incorporated into a limited number of discs. The discs were given to friends and family and the limited remaining discs are for sale with all proceeds going to a 501 c(3) nonprofit to fund the "Steady" Ed Memorial Disc Golf Museum at the PDGA International Disc Golf Center in Columbia County, Georgia.

References

1924 births
2002 deaths
20th-century American inventors
United States Army personnel of World War II
American disc golfers